Bréban is a commune in the Marne department in northeastern France. An important Merovingian grave group was found in the vicinity of Bréban in the nineteenth century. It is now held by the British Museum.

Population

See also
Communes of the Marne department

References

Communes of Marne (department)

la:Braux-Saint-Remy